Heidi Neururer (born 5 January 1979) is a professional snowboarder from Austria. Her speciality is the Parallel (Giant) Slalom.

Career highlights

FIS World Snowboard Championships
2003 – Kreischberg, 15th at parallel giant slalom
2003 – Kreischberg, 19th at parallel slalom
2005 – Whistler,  2nd at parallel slalom
2007 – Arosa,  1st at parallel slalom
2007 – Arosa, 27th at parallel giant slalom
World Cup
2001 – Ischgl,  3rd at parallel giant slalom
2002 – Whistler,  3rd at parallel slalom
2002 – Stoneham,  3rd at parallel giant slalom
2003 – Arosa,  3rd at parallel giant slalom
2005 – Maribor,  3rd at parallel giant slalom
2005 – Sierra Nevada,  2nd at parallel slalom
2006 – Landgraaf,  3rd at parallel slalom
2006 – Bad Gastein (1),  3rd at parallel slalom
2006 – Bad Gastein (2),  2nd at parallel slalom
2007 – Nendaz,  2nd at parallel slalom
2007 – Bardonecchia,  2nd at parallel giant slalom
2007 – Shukolovo,  1st at parallel slalom
2007 – Landgraaf,  2nd at parallel slalom
2007 – Sölden,  2nd at parallel giant slalom
2007 – Limone Piemonte,  1st at parallel giant slalom
2007 – Nendaz,  2nd at parallel slalom
2007 – La Molina,  1st at parallel slalom
European Cup
2002 – Kranjska Gora,  3rd at parallel giant slalom
National Championships
2003 – Mariapfarr/Fanningsberg,  1st at parallel giant slalom
2003 – Mariapfarr/Fanningsberg,  3rd at parallel slalom
2004 – Bad Gastein,  1st at parallel giant slalom
2005 – Kreischberg,  3rd at parallel giant slalom
2007 – Haus im Ennstal,  3rd at parallel slalom

References
 

1979 births
Living people
Austrian female snowboarders